The New England Collegiate Baseball League (NECBL) is a 13-team collegiate summer baseball wooden bat league founded in 1993 and sanctioned by the NCAA and Major League Baseball. Each NECBL team plays an eight-week, 44-game schedule during June and July, with a playoff in early August. Like the Cape Cod Baseball League and other amateur leagues, the NECBL is a showcase for top college-level players, giving professional baseball scouts a chance to see prospective pros playing against each other. Along with the Cape Cod Baseball League, Northwoods League, and Coastal Plain League, it is considered one of the top summer leagues in the country and is a part of the National Alliance of College Summer Baseball.  In 2019, the Collegiate Summer Baseball Register ranked the NECBL as the 2nd best collegiate summer baseball league, behind only the Cape Cod League.

Founded in 1993, the NECBL began its direction under George Foster, former Cincinnati Reds and New York Mets All-Star and Major League Baseball home run leader, and Emmy Award-winning television producer/director Joseph Consentino. Play started in 1994 and today the NECBL has become a fourteen-team league that plays in all six New England states. It recruits players attending U.S. colleges from New England, the other 44 states, and foreign countries, provided that they come from NCAA-sanctioned colleges or universities, are in good academic standing, have completed at least one year of athletic eligibility, and have at least one year of eligibility remaining.

The NECBL's current commissioner is Sean McGrath, former general manager of the North Adams SteepleCats. McGrath replaced Mario Tiani, who retired following the 2012 season.

League structure
The NECBL became a 13-team league in 2013 with the addition of teams in Rhode Island (Ocean State Waves), Massachusetts (Plymouth Pilgrims) and New York (Saratoga Brigade) (the league's first team to operate outside New England), but reverted to 12 teams after the Brigade folded. On October 30, 2015, the league announced that the Upper Valley Nighthawks would begin play in 2016 in Hartford, Vermont, bringing the league back to 13 teams. The  Plymouth Pilgrims ceased operations after the 2018 season but were replaced by the Martha's Vineyard Sharks, a former member of the Futures Collegiate Baseball League (FCBL). The New Bedford BaySox ceased after the 2019 season, replaced by the Bristol Blues, who also moved from the FCBL. The North Shore Navigators returned to the league in 2021 after nine years in the FCBL.

Teams

Current teams

 A caret (^) denotes an approximate capacity, including lawn seating.

Relocated or renamed teams

Defunct teams

Season structure
In the 2021 season, the league was divided into two seven-team divisions, the North Division and the South Division. During the regular season, teams played 44 regular-season games, solely against division opponents, because of COVID-19 travel concerns. Scheduled doubleheaders were seven-inning games.

The top four teams from each division qualified for the eight-team playoff bracket, in which teams played best-of-three series to determine the champion.

For 2022, the NECBL went to three divisions, with a single pair of games against each out-of-division team.

Past champions

In the NECBL's history, the most successful team is the Newport Gulls, with six league championships and eleven championship series appearances (including one championship appearance as the Cranston, Rhode Island-based Rhode Island Gulls). The Keene Swamp Bats are next with five league titles and the North Shore Navigators have four.

All-Star Game 
The All-Star Game usually takes place from mid- to late July.  Prior to the game a Home Run Derby is held and, since the 2007 All-Star Game, a Special Skill Competition for Most Accurate Arm and Fastest Runner.

Home Run Derby winners

Notable alumni
The following former NECBL players have gone on to play in Major League Baseball.  Former NECBL players have reached the major league rosters of all thirty MLB teams, the thirtieth team being the Philadelphia Phillies when, in September 2015, Brian Bogusevic debuted with the team.

Media
All NECBL games are broadcast online through the NECBL Broadcast Network from Blueframe, with Pointstreak providing live stats for all games.

On May 14, 2010, the league signed an agreement with Pointstreak.  Pointstreak provides "real-time scoring, official statistics, and administration services" to the NECBL.  A highlight of Pointstreak's services is Game Live, a real-time statistics feature providing play-by-play for every NECBL game.

In 2020, the league announced that Blueframe would provide the official streaming service for the league.

See also
 List of Collegiate Summer Baseball Leagues

Notes

External links
New England Collegiate Baseball League

Team websites
Danbury Westerners
Keene Swampbats
Mystic Schooners
New Bedford Bay Sox
Newport Gulls
North Adams SteepleCats
Ocean State Waves
Plymouth Pilgrims
Sanford Mainers
Valley Blue Sox
Vermont Mountaineers
Winnipesaukee Muskrats
North Shore Navigators

 
Summer baseball leagues
1993 establishments in the United States
College baseball leagues in the United States
Sports leagues established in 1993
Baseball leagues in Vermont
Baseball leagues in Connecticut
Baseball leagues in Rhode Island
Baseball leagues in Massachusetts
Baseball leagues in New Hampshire
Baseball leagues in Maine
Baseball leagues in New York (state)